In mathematics, the family of Debye functions is defined by

The functions are named in honor of Peter Debye, who came across this function (with n = 3) in 1912 when he analytically computed the heat capacity of what is now called the Debye model.

Mathematical properties

Relation to other functions 

The Debye functions are closely related to the polylogarithm.

Series expansion 
They have the series expansion

where  is the n-th Bernoulli number.

Limiting values 

Derivative 

The derivative obeys the relation

where  is the Bernoulli function.

Applications in solid-state physics

The Debye model 

The Debye model has a density of vibrational states
 for 
with the Debye frequency ωD.

Internal energy and heat capacity 

Inserting g into the internal energy 

with the Bose–Einstein distribution
.
one obtains
.
The heat capacity is the derivative thereof.

Mean squared displacement 

The intensity of X-ray diffraction or neutron diffraction at wavenumber q is given by 
the Debye-Waller factor or the Lamb-Mössbauer factor.
For isotropic systems it takes the form
).
In this expression, the mean squared displacement refers to just once Cartesian component
ux of the vector u that describes the displacement of atoms from their equilibrium positions.
Assuming harmonicity and developing into normal modes,
one obtains

Inserting the density of states from the Debye model, one obtains
.
From the above power series expansion of  follows that the mean square displacement at high temperatures is linear in temperature
.
The absence of  indicates that this is a classical result. Because  goes to zero for  it follows that for 
 (zero-point motion).

References

Further reading

 
 "Debye function" entry in MathWorld, defines the Debye functions without prefactor n/xn

Implementations 
 
 
  Fortran 77 code
 Fortran 90 version
 
 
 C version of the GNU Scientific Library

Special functions
Peter Debye